Emily S. Oakey (sometimes incorrectly spelled, "Oakley"; October 8, 1829 – May 11, 1883) was an American educator, author, and poet. She published Dialogues and Conversations in 1879, and At the Foot of Parnassus in 1883.

Biography
Emily Sullivan Oakey was born October 8, 1829, in Albany, New York. She was graduated from the Albany Female Academy in 1850.

In 1850, she wrote the lyrics to "What Shall the Harvest Be?", but was not generally known until Mr. Sankey included it among his solos, the music being composed especially for it by Mr. P. P. Bliss. It was her only contribution to the cause of evangelism. She was the author of Dialogues and Conversations, as well as At the Foot of Parnassus, a collection of poems.

Beginning in 1854 and until her death in 1883, she taught English literature, logic, Latin, German, and French in Albany Female Academy.

She died May 11, 1883, in Albany.

Bibliography

 Dialogues and Conversations, by Emily S. Oakey (New York City/Chicago/New Orleans: A. S. Barnes, 1879)
 At the Foot of Parnassus, by Emily S. Oakey (Albany, New York: D. R. Niver, 1883)

References

Attribution
 
 

1829 births
1883 deaths
19th-century American women educators
19th-century American educators
19th-century American women musicians
Writers from Albany, New York
Educators from New York (state)
American lyricists
American women hymnwriters